The Italian Women's Cup (Italian: Coppa Italia di calcio femminile) is the national women's football cup competition in Italy and was first held in 1971.

List of finals

See also
Coppa Italia, men's edition

Notes

References

External links
Cup at soccerway.com

Bibliography

 

 
Ita
Recurring sporting events established in 1971
Women
1971 establishments in Italy
Coppa